The Westview ferry terminal is a ferry terminal in Powell River, British Columbia, Canada. It is located on Malaspina Strait, part of the Strait of Georgia, on the northern Sunshine Coast and provides connections to Texada Island and Vancouver Island. The ferry port is connected to Highway 101 via a short access road.

Routes
BC Ferries (British Columbia Ferry Services Inc.), the main operator of ferry services on the west coast of British Columbia, operates the following routes:

Route 17 – Powell River (via Westview) to Comox (via Little River)
Route 18 – Powell River (via Westview) to Texada Island (via Blubber Bay)

Notes

References

External links
Schedules | BC Ferries

BC Ferries
Ferry terminals in British Columbia
Powell River, British Columbia